Andrea Schaller (born 14 September 1976) is a German former footballer who played as a goalkeeper. She made one appearance for the Germany national team in 2000. She was also part of Germany's squad for the women's football tournament at the 2000 Summer Olympics, but did not play in any matches.

References

External links
 

1976 births
Living people
German women's footballers
Women's association football goalkeepers
Germany women's international footballers
Place of birth missing (living people)